Jack Habib (26 April 1912 – 9 February 1995) was a Turkish basketball player. He competed in the men's tournament at the 1936 Summer Olympics.

References

External links
 

1912 births
1995 deaths
Turkish men's basketball players
Olympic basketball players of Turkey
Basketball players at the 1936 Summer Olympics
Basketball players from Istanbul
20th-century Turkish people